The large wren-babbler (Turdinus macrodactylus) is a species of bird in the family Pellorneidae.
It is found in the Malay Peninsula, Sumatra and Java.
Its natural habitat is subtropical or tropical moist lowland forest.
It is threatened by habitat loss.

References

Collar, N. J. & Robson, C. 2007. Family Timaliidae (Babblers)  pp. 70 – 291 in; del Hoyo, J., Elliott, A. & Christie, D.A. eds. Handbook of the Birds of the World, Vol. 12. Picathartes to Tits and Chickadees. Lynx Edicions, Barcelona.

large wren-babbler
Birds of the Malay Peninsula
Birds of Sumatra
Birds of Java
large wren-babbler
Taxonomy articles created by Polbot